The 1932 Irish Greyhound Derby took place during August with the final being held on 15 August 1932 at Shelbourne Park in Dublin.

In 1928 Harold's Cross introduced a competition called the National Derby that would become the modern day Irish Derby, the race was unofficial at this stage because Harold's Cross organised the National Derby without consulting with the Irish racing authorities.

In 1932 the Irish Coursing Club issued a new list of classic races to be run in 1932 and controversy followed because Harold's Cross had been given the Oaks and not the Derby. Shelbourne Park had been given the premier event despite the fact that Harold's Cross had effectively started the competition. 

The winner Guideless Joe won £200 and was owned by leading jockey Jack Moylan and bred by Cornelius Forde.

Final result 
At Shelbourne Park (over 525 yards):

Distances 
Neck, 4 (lengths)

Competition report
In the first semi final on 3 August Castleve defeated The Singer by 4 lengths in 30.51. The second on 6 August resulted in Malhoe Man beating Master Chant by a length and finally on 8 August Silvery Sail beat 1-3f Guideless Joe by a length. In the final Guideless Joe took a winning lead on the back straight holding off Malhoe Man by a neck.

See also
1932 UK & Ireland Greyhound Racing Year

References

Greyhound Derby
Irish Greyhound Derby